Wray-with-Botton is a civil parish in Lancaster, Lancashire, England. It contains 44 listed buildings that are recorded in the National Heritage List for England.  All of the listed buildings are designated at Grade II, the lowest of the three grades, which is applied to "buildings of national importance and special interest".  The parish contains the village of Wray, and is otherwise rural containing scattered farms.  Apart from a bridge, all the listed buildings are houses, farmhouses, farm buildings, and structures associated with them.

Buildings

References

Citations

Sources

Lists of listed buildings in Lancashire
Buildings and structures in the City of Lancaster